Events from the year 1820 in Denmark.

Incumbents
 Monarch – Frederick VI

Events

Births
 28 January – Vilhelm Pedersen, artist, illustrator (died 1859)
 26 November – Prince Frederick William of Hesse-Kassel (died 1884 in Germany)

Deaths
 1 March – Peter Christian Uldahl, piano maker (born 1779)
 19 April – Johan Ludvig Mansa, landscape architect (born 1740 in Zweibrücken)
 27 May – Jean-Françoìs de Dompierre de Jonquières, merchant, landowner and amateur artist (born 1775)
 30 July – Carl Adolph Castenschiold, landowner and chamberlain (born 1740)

References

 
1820s in Denmark
Denmark
Years of the 19th century in Denmark